CSRD may refer to:
Columbia-Shuswap Regional District, a regional district of British Columbia, Canada
Supreme Council for the Restoration of Democracy, a military junta which staged a coup d'état in Niger in 2010